James Robinson Howe (January 27, 1839 – September 21, 1914) was a U.S. Representative from New York.

Biography 
Born in New York City on January 27, 1839, Howe attended the common schools.
He was employed as a clerk in a dry-goods store.
He moved to Brooklyn in 1870 and engaged in the dry-goods business.

Howe was elected as a Republican to the Fifty-fourth and Fifty-fifth Congresses (March 4, 1895 – March 3, 1899). He declined to be a candidate for renomination in 1898. Register of Kings County 1900–1902. He served as director of several banks. He died in North Salem, New York, on September 21, 1914. He was interred in Green-Wood Cemetery, Brooklyn.

References

External links 
 

1839 births
1914 deaths
Burials at Green-Wood Cemetery
Republican Party members of the United States House of Representatives from New York (state)
19th-century American politicians